Ruby Jasmine de Mel (born as රූබි ද මැල්) [Sinhala]; 4 December 1917 – 8 November 2004) was a Sri lankan film actress in Sri Lankan cinema, stage drama and television. One of the earliest pillars in Sri Lankan film history, de Mel is best known for her roles in films Siriyalatha, Kawata Andare, Nalangana and Granny in television serial Amba Yahaluwo. She died on 8 November 2004 by finishing a career that spanned more than six decades.

Personal life
De Mel was born in Moratuwa Kaldemulla area to an Anglicized Sinhala family as the youngest of a family with 12 siblings. Her father was James Perera and mother was Mary Liyanora. She attended to Princess of Wales' College, Moratuwa and Newstead Girls College, Negombo. She was an announcer for Radio Ceylon at its inception. She married at the age of 17 and then divorced when she was 27 years old.

Acting career
de Mel broke into acting with a role in the theatrical play Handahana directed by T. B. Ilangaratne. This performance drew the attention of leading playwright and filmmaker B. A. W. Jayamanne who asked her to play a part in his film Mathabedaya (1955) to be shot in India. Under the pretense of a vacation with friends (due to disapproval by her family), de Mel travelled to India and made her film debut in the film under the alias Vinodha Rasanjali. She reverted to her real name after her first few films.

de Mel would go on to appear in such films as Perakadoru Baana (1955), Daiva Vipakaya (1956), Suraya, Siriyalatha, Surasena (1957), Kawata Andare, Nalangana (1960), Kala Kala De Pala Pala De, Chandali (1964), Handapana (1965), Magul Poruwa (1967), Bicycle Hora (1968), Hari Maga (1969), Penawa Neda (1970), Ihatha Athmaya (1972), Aparadaya Saha Danduwama, Sinawai Inawai (1973), Bambaru Awith (1978), Thana Giravi (1983), Mangala Thagga, Kawuluwa and Obatai Priye Adare (1987). She was also one of the Sri Lankan actors picked to appear in the villager scene in Indiana Jones and the Temple of Doom (1984) alongside D. R. Nanayakkara, Denawaka Hamine, Iranganie Serasinghe, Jessica Wickremasinghe, Oswald Jayasinghe and Dharmadasa Kuruppu.

de Mel branched out as a director in 1967 with Pipene Kumudu which featured the maiden role of actress Sumana Amarasinghe. de Mel made her way into television in the 1980s with roles in the television serials Pinmada Puthun, Rankahawunu and Amba Yahaluwo.

Later on in her life, de Mel donated her house in Moratuwa to function as a center for handicapped children and moved to the St. Andrew’s Home for Elders at Rajagiriya. She died on November 8, 2004.

Filmography
Wakishta started her film career with B.A.W. Jayamanne's 1955 film Mathabhedaya. Then she acted more than 75 films. Some of his popular acting came through films such as Bambaru Awith, Akkara Paha, Sikuruliya and Ahas Maliga.

Awards and Accolades
 Honorary Degree - Given by International Open University

United Lanka Fan Society Film Festival

|-
|| 1965 ||| Dheewarayo || Best Supporting Actress ||

Sarasaviya Film Festival

|-
|| 1965 ||| Dheewarayo || Jury Award || 
|-
|| 1995 ||| Contribution to cinema || Rana Thisara Award ||

References

External links

Aristophanes on the Sinhala stage

2004 deaths
Sri Lankan film actresses
Sinhalese actresses
People from Moratuwa
1917 births
Sri Lankan stage actresses
Sri Lankan television actresses